The 2014 Selangor FA Season is Selangor FA's 9th season playing soccer in the Malaysia Super League since its inception in 2004. This was Mehmet Durakovic's first season as manager and coach of the team.  He replaced the interim manager, P. Maniam, who in turn had been serving in that capacity after Irfan Bakti Abu Salim resigned in 2013.

Selangor FA began the season on 18 January 2014. They will also compete in three domestic cups; The FA Cup Malaysia, Malaysia Cup and also in an international cup; AFC Cup.

Kit
Supplier: Kappa / Sponsor: Selangor

Players

First Team Squad

Transfers

Transfers In

Transfers Out

Pre-season and friendlies

Selangor FA Friendlies

Friendly Match 1

Friendly Match 2

Friendly Match 3

Friendly Match 4

Pra-Malaysia Cup

Friendly Match 5

Friendly Match 6

Competitions

Overall

Overview

Malaysia Super League

Table

Results summary

Results by round

Selangor FA Results
Fixtures and Results of the Malaysia Super League 2014 season.

Malaysia Super League

'

Results overview

FA Cup

AFC Cup

Group Stage

Group F

Malaysia  Cup
Selangor joined the competition in the group stage.

Group stage

Group D

Knockout phase

Quarter-finals

Statistics

Squad statistics

Appearances (Apps.) numbers are for appearances in competitive games only including sub appearances.\
Red card numbers denote: Numbers in parentheses represent red cards overturned for wrongful dismissal.

Goalscorers
Includes all competitive matches.

Clean sheets

Disciplinary record

References

Selangor
Selangor FA